Radhae Unakku Kobam Aagathadi (Please don't be angry, my darling) is a Tamil song first sung by M. K. Thyagaraja Bhagavathar in his 1937 film Chintamani. It is the first Tamil film song to become a cult classic. The song was parodied in the 1941 film Sabapathy. An adaptation of the song was sung by T. M. Soundararajan in the film Kulamagal Radhai (1963).

References

Tamil-language songs
1937 songs
Indian film songs
Tamil film songs
Songs with music by Papanasan Sivam
Songs with lyrics by Papanasan Sivam
M. K. Thyagaraja Bhagavathar songs
T. M. Soundararajan songs